Thomas Parran may refer to:
Thomas Parran Sr. (1860–1955), congressman from Maryland
Thomas Parran (surgeon general) (1892–1968), son of Thomas Parran, Sr. and surgeon general of the United States